La Cruz is a small city in the Mexican state of Sinaloa. It stands at 
.
The city reported 15,657 inhabitants in the 2010 census.

La Cruz, Sinaloa, commonly known in Spanish as La Cruz de Elota, is the municipal seat of Sinaloa's Elota municipality, and is the site of Elota's municipal hall.  There are shops and schools, as well as a nearby beach area, better known as Ceuta's Beach, which is located 8 km from La Cruz.

La Cruz is located between Culiacán (the capital of Sinaloa) and Mazatlán (Sinaloa's most important tourist destination and biggest harbor).  Culiacán lies to the north at a distance of 120 km (74.5 miles) and Mazatlán to the south with a distance of 100 km (62 miles approximately).

References

External list 
 http://www.sinaloa.gob.mx/conociendo/municipios/elota.htm

Populated places in Sinaloa